This is a list of lunar meteorites. That is, meteorites that have been identified as having originated from Earth's Moon.

Notes

Where multiple meteorites are listed (e.g. NWA 4472/4485), they are believed to be pieces of the same original body. The mass shown is the total.

AaU - 
ALH – Allan Hills, Antarctica
Asuka – Antarctica 
Calcalong Creek – Australia
Dar al Gani – Libya
Dho - Dhofar, Oman
EET – Elephant Moraine, Antarctica
Kalahari – Botswana
LAP – LaPaz Icefield, Antarctica
MAC – MacAlpine Hills, Antarctica
MET – Meteorite Hills, Antarctica
MIL – Miller Range, Antarctica
NEA – Northeast Africa: Sudan
NWA – Northwest Africa: Morocco, Algeria
PCA – Pecora Escarpment, Antarctica
QUE – Queen Alexandra Range, Antarctica
SaU – Sayh al Uhaymir, Oman
Yamato – Antarctica

Source: Washington University in St. Louis, Department of Earth and Planetary Science.

See also
 Glossary of meteoritics
 List of Martian meteorites

References

External links
 An Up-to-Date List of Lunar Meteorites — Washington University in St. Louis.
 Lunar meteorites  — Washington University in St. Louis.
 Taylor, G. J. (Oct., 2004) New Lunar Meteorite Provides its Lunar Address and Some Clues about Early Bombardment of the Moon. Planetary Science Research Discoveries.
 Lunar meteorites — Meteoritical Bulletin Database.

-
Meteorites